St. Monica's Church is a historic former Roman Catholic parish church in the Diocese of Brooklyn, located in Jamaica, Queens, New York. It was built in 1856 and is a brick basilica-type building in the Romanesque style.  It features a four-story entrance tower in the center of its three-bay-wide front facade. Saint Monica's Church has been refurbished on the Campus of York College as a child care center.

Early history 

St. Monica's Roman Catholic Church was constructed by master mason Anders Peterson under the direction of Reverend Anthony Farley. The Church is marked by its distinctive central campanile, which is reminiscent of the Romanesque architecture. This also made it one of the earliest surviving examples of Early Romanesque Revival architecture in New York, and one of the only Roman Catholic Churches in the city executed in this style. Father Anthony Farley arrived at St. Monica's in 1854 to begin his influential term as its pastor and to help with the plans for the construction of a new church on five lots of land on Washington Street (160th Street). Four such lots near the old frame church were given to the Church by a French woman from New York and Farley purchased the fifth. The cost for this church's construction was $25,000. Farley selected Jamaica master mason Anders Peterson, a Dane who also owned a local grist mill, as the contractor. Peterson was prominently familiar with the contemporary building history of the area and was responsible for the fine masonry of the First Reformed Church (1861-1863) and that of Grace Episcopal Church (1861-1863). The cornerstone of the building was laid in 1856 and on August 15, 1857, Bishop Loughlin, the first Bishop of Brooklyn, presided over the dedication of the church.

St. Monica's Roman Catholic Church was designed as a red brick Romanesque Revival style building with a tall central campanile and an Italian flavor. The structure was given "an impression of height beyond its actual size" by slender pilasters outlining the brick. Most of the building's modest decoration was made so by the delicate brick situated on the top of the side walls. The inside of the church is a great open hall, which has been redecorated twice in a much higher style (during 1893 and the 1930s). It was constructed with no interior columns for support; the interior was made spacious and could seat 500 people. During the 1940s, Mario M. Cuomo was an altar boy for this church.

Neglect and preservation

St. Monica's Roman Catholic Church has been destroyed by vandalism and neglect. The church's leaded-glass windows were broken, the copper gutters were ripped off the roof, holes were chopped into the sides of the building, and all the inside pews were carried away. Additionally, St. Monica's Church was brought to ruin and neglect when one of Long Island's youngest colleges was built. It held a final Mass of thanksgiving before it closed its doors to make way for the growing multimillion-dollar York College expansion.

Henry Ludder Jr., head of a committee within the Friends of Jamaica History, stated that St. Monica's Church was a historic site that "not only could be preserved – it could become an important community resource. St. Monica's Church, the oldest Catholic Church on Long Island, was considered to be a fine and early example of Victorian Italianate public architecture. A final Mass was held in June 1973, and the building has remained empty and slowly deteriorated since then.

According to an article, St. Monica's Church became vacant and was in a deteriorating state in the 1970s; it was marked for demolition by the city's Housing Preservation and Developing Department. However, the demolition order was "placed on hold" pending efforts by the Friends of Jamaica History and the Queens Borough President's Office to preserve the building as a historic site. Both argued that the church could be restored and repaired for public use and be protected if funded with $300,000 to $500,000.

It was listed by the New York City Landmarks Preservation Commission in 1979 and on the National Register of Historic Places in 1980.

Usage as day care center

St. Monica's Roman Catholic Church, after years of neglect and partial collapse, has been re-purposed as a child's day care center. According to Robert Hampton, president of York College which is part of the City University System, St. Monica "symbolizes in many respects what York College symbolizes to its community. A place for people to transform their lives as St. Monica had to transform her life. It's important to have a sense of history." In December 2003, ground was broken and acquired for the York College Child Care Center, cost a state-funded $4.7 million; this project's architecture represented "a fashion of something old and something new." This two-story, 10,000-square-foot steel and glass day care center incorporated the two-story brick facade and bell tower, which were all that remained of the 1856 Roman Catholic Church. The Church's walls and roof collapsed in 1999 following 12 days of torrential rain fall . However, the relic was saved on the recommendation of the New York City Landmarks Preservation Commission.

This 10,000-square-foot red brick, steel and glass building was made to accommodate up to 100 kids; the ages of the children ranged from infants under six months of age to pre-schoolers. The facility included learning spaces and eight playrooms; its hours of service then were from 8 a.m. to 10 p.m. for both day and night students. According to York student and psychology major, Rita Kalu, "It will be really nice, and help the students stay in school and finish in four years' time."

References

19th-century Roman Catholic church buildings in the United States
Churches on the National Register of Historic Places in New York (state)
Former Roman Catholic church buildings in New York (state)
Jamaica, Queens
New York City Designated Landmarks in Queens, New York
Properties of religious function on the National Register of Historic Places in Brooklyn
Properties of religious function on the National Register of Historic Places in Queens, New York
Roman Catholic churches completed in 1856
Roman Catholic churches in Queens, New York
Romanesque Revival church buildings in New York City